For information on all University of Arkansas at Pine Bluff sports, see Arkansas–Pine Bluff Golden Lions

The Arkansas–Pine Bluff Golden Lions baseball team is a varsity intercollegiate athletic team of the University of Arkansas at Pine Bluff in Pine Bluff, Arkansas, United States. The team is a member of the Southwestern Athletic Conference, which is part of the National Collegiate Athletic Association's Division I. The team plays its home games at the Torii Hunter Baseball Complex in Pine Bluff, Arkansas. The Golden Lions are coached by Carlos James.

Head coaches

Only 10 of Spearman's 21 season's had records available

Major League Baseball
Arkansas–Pine Bluff has had 6 Major League Baseball Draft selections since the draft began in 1965.

See also
List of NCAA Division I baseball programs

References

External links